Punjab Steelers was an Indian professional basketball team located in Punjab, India. The team last competed in India's UBA Pro Basketball League.

The team's head coach was Gurkripal Singh.

Players
Punjab Steelers season 4 roster

References

External links
Presentation at Asia-basket.com
Facebook

Basketball teams in India
Basketball in Punjab, India
Basketball teams established in 2015